Two Buttes is a dual-peaked mountain in Prowers County, Colorado. The south peak is about  higher than the north one, and both are connected by a saddle.

The peaks, on private land, are located just north of the Two Buttes Reservoir State Wildlife Area, located across the border in Baca County just to the south. They are located just east of Highway 385/287. The town of Two Buttes is also located in Baca County, to the south of the peaks.

References

External links
Two Buttes Reservoir State Wildlife Area (includes a map of the area)

Buttes of Colorado
Mountains of Prowers County, Colorado
North American 1000 m summits